Ridings may refer to:
Ridings (surname)
Riding (country subdivision), an area of government, a division of a county or an electoral district
The Ridings Centre, a shopping centre in Wakefield, West Yorkshire, UK
The Ridings School in Halifax, West Yorkshire, UK
The Ridings High School near Bristol, UK
Ridings FM, a radio station serving the Wakefield District of West Yorkshire, England
Yorkshire Ridings Society, a group calling for the wider recognition of the historic borders of Yorkshire
Two Ridings Community Foundation, an English charity in Yorkshire
Ridings Mill, Virginia, an unincorporated community in the United States